The Best of the Specials is a CD and DVD compilation album by The Specials and The Special A.K.A released in 2008. The compilation was re-issued on double vinyl-LP in 2019.

Track listing

Disc 1 (CD)

Disc 2 (DVD)

Vinyl LP [2019]

References

2008 compilation albums
Music video compilation albums
2008 video albums
The Specials compilation albums
The Specials video albums